Ukrah is a village in Haringhata CD Block in Kalyani subdivision of Nadia district in the Indian state of West Bengal.

Geography
It has an average elevation of 12 metres (39 feet).

Demographics
 India census, Ukrah had a population of 13,548, comprising 6,974 males and 6,574 females. Ukrah has an average literacy rate of 83.91%, with 1,309 (9.66%) of the population between 0–6 years of age.

Groundwater contamination 
Ukrah is one of the areas where the groundwater is affected by arsenic contamination.

References

External links

Villages in Nadia district